Resursa Obywatelska Palace (Polish: Resursa Obywatelska) - a historical building, located by Krakowskie Przedmieście in Warsaw, Poland.

The palace was designed by architect Edward Cichocki and built by Leon Karasiński between 1860 and 1861. Between 1861 and 1939 the building was home to the Merchant's Resource Association (Resursa Obywatelska). Since World War II the building houses the Society for Communication with the Polish Diaspora "Polonia" (Towarzystwo Łączności z Polonią Zagraniczną "Polonia").

References

Palaces in Warsaw